Stadionul Giulești-Valentin Stănescu is the name of several football stadiums. It may refer to:

 Stadionul Giulești-Valentin Stănescu (1939) - the original stadium, demolished in 2019
 Stadionul Giulești-Valentin Stănescu (2020) - its replacement, under construction